Russian Federation hosted and competed at the 2013 Summer Universiade in Kazan, Russia. 663 athletes are a part of the Russian team which is the biggest team there. Russian team took a first place with almost a half of gold and more than quarter of all medals and set 38 of 67 records in this Universiade.

Athletics

Men
Track & road events

Badminton

Russia will be represented by five male and six female badminton players.

Men's

Women's

Mixed

Basketball

Russia has a male and a female team.

Men's

The men's team will participate in Group A.

Group play

|}

Quarterfinals

semifinals

Final

Women's

The women's team will participate in Group A.

Roster
The women's team roster is as follows:

|}
| valign="top" |
 Head coach
 

Legend
 (C) Team captain
 nat field describes country of club/university
 Age field is age on July 7, 2013
|}

group play

|}

Quarterfinal

Semifinal

Gold Medal Match

Beach volleyball

Men

Chess

Diving

Men

Fencing

Women

Field hockey

Men's 

Gold Medal Match

Women's

groupplay

 Gold Medal Match

Football

Men's 

Group play

Quarterfinal

Semifinal

Match For Bronze

Women's 

Group play

Classification Round

Gymnastics

Artistic
Men 
Team 

Individual finals

Judo

Rowing

Rugby sevens

Men's

Group play

Quarterfinals

Semifinals

Gold Medal Match

Sambo

Shooting

Swimming

Synchronized swimming

Table tennis

Tennis

Volleyball

Men's

Grouplay 

|}

Quarterfinal

Semifinal

Gold Medal Match

Women's

group play

|}

Water polo

Men's

Group Play

Quarterfinal

semi final

Gold Medal Match

Women's

Group

Quarterfinal

semifinal

Gold Medal Match

Weightlifting

Men

Women

Wrestling

See also
 Sport in Russia

References

2013 in Russian sport
2013
Nations at the 2013 Summer Universiade